Harith ibn Nabhan (Arabic: الحارِث بن نَبهان) was martyred in the battle of Karbala.

Biography 
His father, Nabhan, was the slave of Hamza ibn 'Abd al-Muttalib. Nahban was a brave horseman who died two years after the martyrdom of Hamza. Harith was a companion of Ali ibn Abi Talib and Hasan ibn Ali. He accompanied Hussain ibn Ali to Karbala and was martyred in the first attack of the army of Umar ibn Sa'd.

Harith ibn Nabhan is a different person than Harith ibn Nabhan al-Basri, who was a hadith transmitter.

References 

Husayn ibn Ali
Hussainiya
600s births
680 deaths

Year of birth uncertain
People killed at the Battle of Karbala